The Mercedes-Benz M22 engine is a naturally-aspirated and supercharged, 3.8-liter and 4.0-liter, straight-8 engine, designed, developed and produced by Mercedes-Benz; between 1933 and 1934.

Applications
Mercedes-Benz 380

References

Mercedes-Benz engines
Straight-eight engines
Engines by model
Gasoline engines by model